Thomas John "Tom" Hoff (born June 9, 1973) is a retired American volleyball player. He was a middle blocker and has been with the U.S. national team from 1996 until 2009. He is a three-time Olympian in volleyball Olympics: 2000, 2004 and 2008.

Playing with Iraklis Thessaloniki V.C. he won the silver medal at the 2004–05 CEV Champions League and at the 2005–06 CEV Champions League, and was awarded "Best Spiker".

Personal life
Hoff was born in Chicago to Margaret and Richard Hoff. He has an older brother Rich and an older sister Jennifer.  He is married to Sandy Mora and has five daughters.

Hoff attended Maine South High School in Park Ridge, Illinois, where he graduated in 1991.

In addition to indoor volleyball, Hoff also played on the Bud Light Pro Beach Volleyball tour.

Education
Hoff earned his Bachelor of Science degree in Mechanical Engineering.

Ohio State
Hoff spent his first two years at Ohio State University, where he was a two-year starter for the Buckeyes. As a sophomore in 1993, he was a First-Team All-Midwestern Intercollegiate Volleyball Association (MIVA). He guided the Buckeyes to the MIVA conference title and a 28-10 overall record. His 490 kills rank third all-time in Buckeye history. Hoff was also an AVCA Second Team All American.

Long Beach State
After transferring to Long Beach State in 1994, he sat out due to transfer rules and was redshirted.

In 1995, Hoff was an AVCA First-Team All-American for the 49ers (now known as The Beach) as he notched 751 kills, 176 blocks and a .357 hitting percentage. He set a national record for most matches with 20 or more kills (25) and 10 or more blocks (nine).

In 1996, he repeated as a First-Team All-American as he helped the team finish 21-6 and 15-4 (second) in the Mountain Pacific Sports Federation and had season totals of 479 kills, 134 blocks and a .389 attack percentage. In the Long Beach State men's volleyball record books, Hoff ranked no. 5 in career kills (1,230), no. 2 in kills per game (6.54), no. 4 in hitting percentage (.369) and no. 2 in blocks per game (1.65).

Clubs
  Iraklis Thessaloniki V.C. (2001–2003, 2004–2006)
  VC Lokomotiv-Belogorie (2006–2007)
  Fakel Novy Urengoy (2007–2008)
  Olympiacos S.C. (2008–2009)

Awards

Individuals
 2005–06 CEV Champions League "Best Spiker"
2002 Greek Cup "Most Valuable Player

National team

Senior team
 2008 Summer Olympics,  Gold medal
 2008 FIVB World League,  Gold medal
 2007 America's Cup,  Gold medal
 2005 FIVB World Grand Champions Cup,  Silver medal
 2005 America's Cup,  Gold medal

Clubs
 2009 Greek Championship -  Champion, with Olympiacos S.C.
 2009 Greek Cup -  Champion, with Olympiacos S.C.
 2004–05 CEV Champions League -  Runner-up, with Iraklis Thessaloniki
 2005–06 CEV Champions League -  Runner-up, with Iraklis Thessaloniki
 2006 Greek Cup -  Champion, with Iraklis Thessaloniki

References

External links
 
 

1973 births
Living people
American men's volleyball players
Olympiacos S.C. players
Iraklis V.C. players
Sportspeople from Chicago
Sportspeople from Park Ridge, Illinois
Long Beach State Beach men's volleyball players
Ohio State Buckeyes men's volleyball players
Olympic gold medalists for the United States in volleyball
Volleyball players at the 2000 Summer Olympics
Volleyball players at the 2004 Summer Olympics
Volleyball players at the 2008 Summer Olympics
Aris V.C. players
Medalists at the 2008 Summer Olympics
Middle blockers